Lake Oroville State Recreation Area (LOSRA) is a state park unit of California, United States, surrounding Lake Oroville, a reservoir on the Feather River.  It is located in Butte County outside Oroville, California.  The  park was established in 1967.  The recreation area "includes Lake Oroville and the surrounding lands and facilities within the project area as well as the land and waters in and around the Diversion Pool and Thermalito Forebay, downstream of Oroville Dam."

Recreation
The park and lake support outdoor recreation such as camping, picnicking, horseback riding, hiking, sail and power-boating, water-skiing, fishing, swimming, boat-in camping, floating campsites, and horse camping.  There is a visitor center with interpretive exhibits and a  observation tower overlooking the lake and dam.

Nearby attractions are Feather Falls and the Feather River Fish Hatchery.

Hidden train tunnels - When the water level gets low you can see train tunnels that are normally submerged. One tunnel is found in the Berry Creek cove when the water level gets down to about 720 ft level.

See also
List of California state parks

References

External links 
Lake Oroville State Recreation Area

California State Recreation Areas
Feather River
Protected areas of Butte County, California
Protected areas established in 1967
1967 establishments in California